is a railway station on the Chikuhi Line in Nishi-ku, Fukuoka, Japan. It is operated by JR Kyushu and is on the Chikuhi Line.

Lines
Local and weekday rapid services on the Chikuhi Line stop at this station.

Station layout 
The station consists of two side platforms serving two tracks. The station building is a modern concrete structure and houses a small waiting area, a shop and a staffed ticket window. Access to the opposite side platform is by means of a footbridge.

Management of the station has been outsourced to the JR Kyushu Tetsudou Eigyou Co., a wholly owned subsidiary of JR Kyushu specialising in station services. It staffs the ticket counter which is equipped with a Midori no Madoguchi facility.

Platforms

Adjacent stations

History
July 20, 1986: Opening of the station

History
Japanese National Railways (JNR) opened the station on 20 July 1986 as an additional station on the existing track of the Chikuhi Line. With the privatization of JNR on 1 April 1987, control of the station passed to JR Kyushu.

Passenger statistics
In fiscal 2016, the station was used by an average of 2,670 passengers daily (boarding passengers only), and it ranked 68th among the busiest stations of JR Kyushu.

Vicinity
Fukuoka City Subway - Meinohama train depot
Earthwork ruins of the Mongolian attacks
Shikanoshima beach
Nishitetsu bus stop

See also
 List of railway stations in Japan

References

External links
Shimoyamato Station (JR Kyushu)

Railway stations in Japan opened in 1986
Railway stations in Fukuoka Prefecture
Chikuhi Line